Kanasoko Tameike Dam is an earthfill dam located in Fukuoka Prefecture in Japan. The dam is used for irrigation. The catchment area of the dam is  km2. The dam impounds about 7  ha of land when full and can store 214 thousand cubic meters of water. The construction of the dam was completed in 1937.

References

Dams in Fukuoka Prefecture
1937 establishments in Japan